Skull Island: Reign of Kong is a trackless dark ride located at Universal's Islands of Adventure theme park at Universal Orlando. Universal Creative based its design on various films in the King Kong franchise and consulted with Peter Jackson, who directed the 2005 film King Kong, during the initial phase of the project. The ride officially opened to the public on July 13, 2016, which was preceded by a series of soft openings held the previous month.

History
Construction on a brand new King Kong attraction began in March 2014. It was going to be built between the Jurassic Park and Toon Lagoon areas, as an expansion for Islands of Adventure. 

On May 6, 2015, Universal's Islands of Adventure revealed that the new ride would be called Skull Island: Reign of Kong. It was originally planned to soft open in late 2015, but this was eventually delayed to June 9, 2016. The ride opened to the public the following month.

Summary

Queue
Guests enter under a giant sculpture of King Kong. Guests start to proceed into a line outside of the temple where they can hear radio broadcast advertising the expedition group and playing music. They then proceed into the temple of the natives, where many skulls line the walls and figures of their beliefs lie. Guests then enter into a chamber where a shamaness is performing a ritual and possibly warning guests that they are in sacred lands and are not safe. As guests proceed through the temple, they encounter bodies of the dead and possibly natives that may scare oblivious guests. After leaving the temple area, guests proceed into the base camp where many supplies are stacked and ready to be taken on the trucks. Guests also encounter an animatronic worm that moves around but doesn't attack. After this line, guests pick up their 3D glasses and are sent to the boarding area to wait for their truck to arrive. The guests then board a truck, with a driver played by an animatronic person styled to look like a Universal cast member; the driver character varies from one truck to the next.

Ride
Guests enter an expedition truck with one of five different drivers, each one containing their own backstory and dialog for the ride. The ride slows down and passes by the bones of a giant ape, as well as a few bat-like "Terapusmordax" animatronics. Guests then turn and meet the other expedition group, who are getting ready to set up a camp. However, guests are attacked by a swarm of Terapusmordax, one of which snatches up Kate, one of the few named explorers. She is taken over the truck and out of view of the riders. Both trucks speed off, following Kate to rescue her. In the back of the cave, a shadow of Kong can be seen.

The expedition trucks move on to a swamp, where they encounter giant bugs such as worm-like Carnictis, cricket-like Decarnocimex and Arachno-Claws. Kate manages to escape the Terapusmordax that took her and fights off the creatures that threaten her and the riders. After defending the truck for a few moments, she tells them to go without her, the driver refusing to leave. Right before she is able to jump onto the truck, a Deplector's claw reaches out and grabs her, dragging her into a cave as she struggles to escape. The vehicle moves on to the jungle, where they are told to return to base camp. They later encounter small carnivorous dinosaurs, Venatosaurus, who chase the truck as it speeds away and tries to escape but ends up crashing and waking up a group of larger dinosaurs, Vastatosaurus rex, which kill a few of the Venatosaurus, cause them to scatter. The V-rexes begin attacking the truck but before the truck can be badly damaged, Kong leaps from behind a temple and begins to fight the dinosaurs. Kong and the dinosaurs continue to fight when the truck from earlier shows up to help the riders.

Unfortunately, both trucks end up falling into a pit because of the weakening walkway around it. They swing from vines while Kong faces the last V-rex and causes both the other truck and the dinosaur to fall, but saves the truck allowing the crew to survive the fall. The truck also plummets but is saved as well by Kong, who roars and climbs away. The driver sends out a report that the truck had found Kong. The truck then drives and meets Kong in an animatronic form, who sniffs at the riders and stares but then roars, causing the driver to quickly speed away. The ride vehicle returns to base camp where Kate radioes that she and the others are safe.

Weather conditions
During optimal weather, the trucks travel outside and up through the massive gates leading to Skull Island at the start of the ride. During inclement weather, the trucks take a bypass route indoors, cutting out the outdoor portion of the ride, so it can remain open during inclement weather. This results in a slightly shorter ride experience.

Reception
Skull Island: Reign of Kong has received mostly positive reactions. Whatculture.com liked it, calling it "a beast of an attraction" and called the animatronics "amazing". Tyler Murillo from worldofuniversal.com gave it a score of 4.5 out of 5 stars, calling it an "amazing ride" and "visually stunning inside and out". Matt Timmy Creamer from Moviepilot.com gave the attraction as a whole 7 out of 10 stars, calling the queue line "incredible" and the animatronics "worth the wait", however, was disappointed with the number of screens and lack of practical effects in the ride.

Incidents
 In 2016, a Guatemalan tourist began to feel ill shortly after exiting the ride. His family left him to rest on a bench while they attended another of Universal's attractions. When the family returned, he was found collapsed and was later pronounced dead. A lawsuit claiming that Universal was negligent for not providing warning signs in Spanish was filed, prompting intense debate about reasonableness and personal responsibility. The deceased's family claims Universal should have been more attentive, providing medical care sooner.
 On May 16, 2021, a woman's index finger was severely cut off during mid-ride which had to be partially amputated as a result.

References

King Kong (franchise)
Amusement rides introduced in 2016
2016 3D films
Amusement rides based on film franchises
Animatronic attractions
2016 establishments in Florida